Killer Bee is a Swedish–Canadian rock band formed in the 1990s by songwriters Anders "LA" Rönnblom and Brian "Bee" Frank. Former Europe guitarist Kee Marcello produced and played on the band's third album, World Order Revolution  (1997). Since 1990, Killer Bee has toured Sweden, Norway, Austria, Switzerland, and Germany and performed on some of the biggest festival stages in Europe.

From Hell and Back is their comeback studio album, released in 2012. Brent "The Doctor" Doerner, former Helix guitarist, was a guest guitarist on the record, playing on two songs: "On and On" and "Step into My World". Doerner's video production company, Red D Film and Editing, directed the filming and edited the music videos for two songs from the album: "Step into My World" and "All Night Long". In December 2012, From Hell and Back album won the best Hard Rock/Metal Rock Album of 2012 poll, conducted by music magazine Myglobalmind.

Band members

Current
 Brian "Bee" Frank – lead vocals
 Anders "LA" Rönnblom – bass guitar, backing vocals
 Shawn Duncan – drums, percussion
 André Hägglund – guitar, backing vocals

Past
 Christoffer Sjöström – guitar, backing vocals
 Jimmy DeLisi – guitar, backing vocals
 Eric Tarvids – guitar, backing vocals
 Paul Chapman – guitar, backing vocals
 Jeremy Thornton – keyboards, guitar, backing vocals
 Mats Byström – keyboards, guitar, backing vocals
 Denny DeMarchi – keyboards, guitar, backing vocals
 Johan Abbing – drums, percussion
 Magnus Grundström – drums, percussion
 Morgan Evans – drums, percussion

Discography

Albums
 Raw (1993)
 Cracked Up (1995)
 World Order Revolution (1997)
 Almost There (2011)
 From Hell and Back (2012)
 Evolutionary Children (2013)
 Rock Another Day (2015)
 Killing You Softly (2016)
 Eye in the Sky (2016)
 Remember the Times (2019)

Singles
 "Piece of My Heart" (1994)
 "Take Me Home" (1994)
 "You Think You're Hot" (1994)
 "Hey Hey" (1995)
 "All I Need" (1995)
 "Joystick Warrior" (2016)
 "Higher and Higher" (2016)
 "I'd Love to Change the World" (2016)
 "I Believe" (2016)
 "Get on Board" (2016)

References

External links
 
 Killer Bee official Facebook
 Killer Bee Twitter
 Killer Bee Instagram

Canadian rock music groups
Musical groups established in 1990
Swedish rock music groups